Pultenaea subspicata, commonly known as low bush-pea, is a species of flowering plant in the family Fabaceae and is endemic to south-eastern continental Australia. It is a low-lying, prostrate or mat-forming shrub with elliptic leaves and yellow to pink and orange-red, pea-like flowers.

Description
The flowers are arranged in dense clusters near the ends of branches, with enlarged stipules at the base of the floral leaves.

Taxonomy
Pultenaea subspicata was first formally described in 1864 by George Bentham in Flora Australiensis. The specific epithet (subspicata) means "almost spicate".

Distribution and habitat
Low bush-pea grows in forest, woodland and heathland, usually in stony places and is found on the coast and tablelands of New South Wales south from the Macleay River to a few places in far eastern Victoria.

References

subalpina
Fabales of Australia
Flora of New South Wales
Flora of Victoria (Australia)
Flora of the Australian Capital Territory
Plants described in 1864
Taxa named by George Bentham